"Nique les clones, Pt. II" is a song by French hip hop artist Nekfeu, produced by himself and DJ Elite. It was released on May 25, 2015 as the third single from his debut studio album Feu.

The song entered the French Singles Chart at number 62 on May 30, 2015, and peaked at number 57.

Music video
A lyric video for the song was published on YouTube on May 28, 2015.

Track listing
 Digital download
 "Nique les clones, Pt. II" – 3:44

Chart performance

References
Notes

Citations

2015 singles
2015 songs
Nekfeu songs
French-language songs
Seine Zoo singles
Polydor Records singles
Songs written by Nekfeu